Ricardo Jorge Pires Gomes (born 18 December 1991) is a Cape Verdean professional footballer who plays as a forward for Serbian club FK Partizan.

Club career

Vitória Guimarães
Born in Praia, Gomes moved to Portugal at the age of 17, starting playing football with F.C. Vizela and going on to spend four seasons in the third division. In 2013 he signed with Vitória de Guimarães, being initially assigned to the reserves who also competed at that level.

Gomes made his Primeira Liga debut with the first team on 17 August 2013, coming on as a second-half substitute in a 2−0 home win against S.C. Olhanense. He scored his first goal in the competition on 4 January 2015, in the 4−0 victory over C.D. Nacional also at the Estádio D. Afonso Henriques.

Nacional
In mid-January 2016, Gomes was loaned to precisely Nacional, until June. On 8 August, he agreed to a two-year permanent deal with the Madeirans. 

After no goals in 2016−17, which ended in relegation, the following campaign Gomes led the LigaPro scoring charts at 22 to help the team achieve immediate promotion as champions.

Partizan
On 8 June 2018, Gomes signed with Serbian club FK Partizan. On 26 August he scored his first SuperLiga goal for them, helping to a 3−1 away defeat of FK Mačva Šabac. He added another on 23 September in the 1−1 draw with Red Star Belgrade in the Eternal Derby, being subsequently voted by Mozzart Sport as his side's best player.

Gomes finished his only season with 26 goals across all competitions, which made him the joint-best foreigner in Partizan's history.

Sharjah
In August 2019, Gomes joined UAE Pro League champions Sharjah FC, helping to win the UAE Super Cup on penalties shortly after his arrival. The following February, he was loaned to fellow league club Al-Ittihad Kalba SC until the end of the season.

Return to Partizan
On 25 June 2021, Gomes returned to Partizan and signed a three-year contract. He scored six goals in his first seven competitive appearances, including braces in 4–0 away league wins against FK Proleter Novi Sad and FK Kolubara. He totalled 38 for the campaign for the runners-up, being voted the league's best player and scorer while breaking Mateja Kežman's 2000 record.

International career
Gomes earned his first cap for Cape Verde on 31 March 2015, playing the last ten minutes of the 2–0 friendly win over Portugal in Estoril. On 4 June 2016 he netted his first goal, in the 2–1 away victory against São Tomé and Príncipe in the 2017 Africa Cup of Nations qualifiers.

Career statistics

International

 (Cape Verde score listed first, score column indicates score after each Gomes goal)

Honours
Vitória Guimarães
Supertaça Cândido de Oliveira runner-up: 2013

Nacional
LigaPro: 2017–18

Partizan
Serbian Cup: 2018–19

Sharjah
UAE Super Cup: 2019

Individual
LigaPro top scorer/MVP: 2017–18
Serbian SuperLiga top scorer/MVP: 2021–22

References

External links

1991 births
Living people
Sportspeople from Praia
Cape Verdean footballers
Association football forwards
Primeira Liga players
Liga Portugal 2 players
Segunda Divisão players
F.C. Vizela players
Vitória S.C. players
Vitória S.C. B players
C.D. Nacional players
Serbian SuperLiga players
FK Partizan players
UAE Pro League players
Sharjah FC players
Al-Ittihad Kalba SC players
Süper Lig players
Büyükşehir Belediye Erzurumspor footballers
Cape Verde international footballers
Cape Verdean expatriate footballers
Expatriate footballers in Portugal
Expatriate footballers in Serbia
Expatriate footballers in the United Arab Emirates
Expatriate footballers in Turkey
Cape Verdean expatriate sportspeople in Portugal
Cape Verdean expatriate sportspeople in the United Arab Emirates
Cape Verdean expatriate sportspeople in Turkey